St Columb Road railway station serves the village of St Columb Road in Cornwall, England. All services are operated by Great Western Railway, which also manages the station.

History
The first railway here was a horse-worked line from Newquay Harbour to Hendra Crazey.  It was built by Joseph Treffry and completed in 1849.

The Cornwall Minerals Railway opened its line from Fowey to St Dennis Junction on 1 June 1874, where it connected with Treffry's Newquay Railway.  The trains continued to carry only goods traffic but a passenger service was introduced on 20 June 1876.  The station was originally known as Halloon but was renamed "St Columb Road" on 1 November 1878.

The passing loop was extended in 1933 to accommodate the long holiday trains that were then handled on the branch, but it was taken out of use on 3 January 1965 when the goods yard was closed.

Services
St Columb Road is a request stop on the line, so passengers wishing to alight must inform the conductor and passengers wishing to join the train must signal to the driver. The typical service is one train every two hours in each direction between Par and Newquay, with some services extending to Plymouth and one train in the summer extending to Penzance. On summer Saturdays, there is just one train per day in each direction due to the intercity services running through to Newquay in lieu of the local services. Trains are usually operated by Class 150 Sprinters.

Community rail
The trains between Par and Newquay are designated as a community rail service and is supported by marketing provided by the Devon and Cornwall Rail Partnership.  The line is promoted under the "Atlantic Coast Line" name.

References

Bibliography 
 
 
 

Railway stations in Cornwall
Former Great Western Railway stations
Railway stations in Great Britain opened in 1876
Railway stations served by Great Western Railway
Railway request stops in Great Britain
DfT Category F2 stations